Richard Poe (born January 25, 1946) is an American actor. He has worked in movies, television and on Broadway.

Biography 
Poe was born in Portola, California. He graduated from Pittsburg Senior High School in 1964 then from the University of San Francisco in 1967. He served in the United States Army during the Vietnam War era. Along with Leonard Nimoy, DeForest Kelley, James Doohan, Mark Lenard, Jonathan Frakes, Marina Sirtis, Armin Shimerman and John de Lancie he is one of only a few actors to play the same character on three different Star Trek series. He played Gul Evek in Star Trek: The Next Generation (1987), Star Trek: Deep Space Nine (1993) and Star Trek: Voyager (1995). He appeared in A Christmas Carol  at Ford's Theatre, 2006, as Ebenezer Scrooge, and appeared on Broadway in fourteen productions, including the original M. Butterfly (Tony Award), Our Country's Good, The Pajama Game (Tony Award), Journey's End (Tony Award) and All The Way (Tony Award). He created roles in the off-Broadway productions of Paul Rudnick's Jeffrey and Christopher Durang's Why Torture Is Wrong... and the People Who Love Them.

He provided narration for the audiobook version of the Cormac McCarthy's novels Blood Meridian,The Crossing and Suttree. He won the 2004 Audie Award for his narration of East Of Eden, has been nominated three other times, and has been a frequent recipient of Audiofile Magazine's Earphone Award.

Partial filmography 

 Mystery Mansion (1984) .... Adam Drake
 Born on the Fourth of July (1989) .... Frankie – VA Hospital
 Babes
 Episode: "Pilot" (1990) .... Tyrone
 A Promise to Keep (1990, TV Movie)
 Law & Order
 Episode: "Happily Ever After" (1990) .... Forensic Scientist
 Episode: "Working Mom" (1997) .... Mac Bernum
 Teamster Boss: The Jackie Presser Story (1992, TV Movie) .... Bishop
 The Night We Never Met (1993) .... Bartender
 Frasier
 Episode: "Oops" (1993) .... Chopper Dave
 Episode: "Miracle on Third or Fourth Street" (1993) .... Chopper Dave
 Star Trek: The Next Generation
 Episode: "Journey's End" (1994) ... Gul Evek
 Episode: "Preemptive Strike" (1994) .... Gul Evek
 Star Trek: Deep Space Nine
 Episode: "Playing God" (1994) .... Gul Evek
 Episode: "The Maquis: Part 1" (1994) .... Gul Evek
 Episode: "Tribunal" (1994) .... Gul Evek
 Speechless (1994) .... Tom
 Star Trek: Voyager
 Episode: "Caretaker: Part 1' (1995) .... Gul Evek
 The 5 Mrs. Buchanans .... Ed Buchanan
 Episode: "Clyde and Vivian and Ed and Malice" (1994)
 Episode: "Becoming a Buchanan" (1995)
 Episode: "Viv'acious" (1995)
 Pride & Joy
 Episode: "Terror at 30,000 Feet" (1995) .... Herb
 The Real Adventures of Jonny Quest
 Episode: "Ezekiel Rage" (1996) .... Dr. Smallwood (voice)
 The Prosecutors (1996, TV Movie) .... Roy Mariello
 The Peacemaker (1997) .... DOE Haz-mat Tech #2
 Now and Again
 Episode: "There Are No Words" (2000) .... Admiral
 Ed
 Episode: "Home Is Where the Ducks Are" (2000) .... Jim Ludwig
 Episode: "Hidden Agendas" (2004) .... Dalton Locke
 Transamerica (2005) .... John
 The Warrior Class (2005) .... Magistrate
 Burn After Reading (2008) .... Stretching Gym Patron
 Theresa Is a Mother (2012) .... Roy McDermott
 Delivery Man (2013) .... Loan Officer #3
 Theresa Is a Mother (release 2015) .... Roy McDermett
 Hot Air (2018) .... (voice)

References

External links 

1946 births
Living people
American male film actors
American male stage actors
American male television actors
University of San Francisco alumni
People from Plumas County, California
United States Army soldiers
20th-century American male actors
21st-century American male actors